Vernon-Verona-Sherrill High School, commonly referred to as VVS, is a public high school in Verona, New York. Vernon-Verona-Sherrill High School offers a comprehensive curriculum for grades 9-12 and is part of the Vernon-Verona-Sherrill Central School District which serves students from the towns of Verona and Vernon and the city of Sherrill.

Overview
The main campus of Vernon-Verona-Sherrill High School was built in 1954, and is centrally located between the towns of Vernon and Verona and the city of Sherrill at the intersection of New York State Route 31 and Beacon Light Road. Facilities include a theater, two gymnasiums, fitness center, cafeteria, and a maple syrup factory operated by the Future Farmers of America (FFA) program. The High School building and Middle School building are linked and share some facilities such as the library and sports fields.

U.S. News & World Report's Education website reported in 2016-17 that the school's students scored 84% proficiency in English and 85% proficiency in Math on state exit exams along with a 93% graduation rate in that same year. In 2017, there were 597 students enrolled at VVS, which included 3% minorities and 30% economically disadvantaged students. The school employed 43 full-time teachers in 2017.

Academics
VVS offers a local diploma and the New York State Regents diploma. Students can also take Advanced Placement courses in a number of subjects and receive vocational training at the local Madison-Oneida county BOCES.

Demographics
According to the NYSED's Student Information Repository System the school is 53% male and 47% female with percentage by grades goes as follows: 9-10 grades - 24% enrollment, 11th grade - 25% and 12th grade - 27%.

Extra-curricular activities
Student organizations include a drama club, weight training club, walking club, technology club, math club, interact (student rotary) club, history club, art/photography club, foreign language club, ecology club, ski and snow board club, and chemistry club.

Co-curricular activities and service groups include The Red Zone (school store), The Red Press (school newspaper), peer mediation, National Honor Society, Yearbook Club, Future Farmers of America, LEAD USA, Student Council, Boys’ State, Girls’ State, Global Nexus, student tutors, reading buddies, and Colgate Seminar. Student performing groups in the arts include musical theatre, marching band, chorus, orchestra, stage band, pep band, jazz band, and a trash can band.

Athletics
Sports compete at the Class B, C and D levels in Section III of the New York State Public High School Association. Varsity teams include:

Individual athletes compete on the Oneida High School Swimming and Diving team.

Notable alumni
Matt Patricia - Senior football advisor and former Defensive Coordinator for the New England Patriots, former Head Coach of the Detroit Lions
Clifford Luyk - Former basketball player and coach, who played professionally in Spain and Europe
Philip Markoff -"The Craigslist Killer," an American medical student who was charged with the armed robbery and murder of Julissa Brisman in a Boston hotel on April 14, 2009, and two other armed robberies.
 Adam Kemp - Professional Basketball Player

References

External links
High School Website
Guidance Office Webpage
School Profile
K12Guides Profile
New York State Report Card

Public high schools in New York (state)
Schools in Oneida County, New York
1954 establishments in New York (state)